Craig Cachopa (born 17 January 1992) is a retired South African-born New Zealand cricketer who played for Sussex in English county cricket and Auckland and Wellington at New Zealand domestic level.

Cachopa was born in Welkom, in what is now South Africa's Free State province. His family emigrated to New Zealand in 2002, and he and two older brothers, Carl (born 1986) and Bradley Cachopa (born 1988), have all played first-class cricket in New Zealand. A right-handed batsman and occasional wicket-keeper, Craig Cachopa debuted for the New Zealand under-19s at the age of 16, and later captained the side at the 2010 Under-19 World Cup, hosted by New Zealand. He made his first-class debut for Wellington during the 2011–12 season of the Plunket Shield, but switched to Auckland the following season. Playing for Auckland against Wellington during the 2013–14 season, he scored 203 runs, his highest first-class score and only double century. Cachopa signed a two-year contract with Sussex, beginning with the 2014 English season, qualifying as a domestic player via a Portuguese passport. He has announced his intention to qualify for England, and will consequently be regarded as an overseas player if he wishes to return to Auckland.

In June 2018, he was awarded a contract with Auckland for the 2018–19 season. In September 2018, he was named as the captain of the Auckland Aces for the 2018 Abu Dhabi T20 Trophy. He was the leading run-scorer for Auckland in the 2018–19 Ford Trophy, with 412 runs in eleven matches.

References

External links

1992 births
Auckland cricketers
Living people
Sportspeople from Welkom
New Zealand cricketers
New Zealand people of Portuguese descent
South African emigrants to New Zealand
Sussex cricketers
Wellington cricketers
Naturalised citizens of New Zealand
Wicket-keepers